Anoxynops is a genus of flies in the family Tachinidae.

Species
A. aldrichi (Curran, 1926)
A. aurifrons Thompson, 1968
A. conicus Townsend, 1927
A. flavocalyptratus (Wulp, 1890)

References

Diptera of North America
Exoristinae
Tachinidae genera
Taxa named by Charles Henry Tyler Townsend